Gamlet Valeryevich Siukayev (born 9 March 1981) is a former Russian professional football player.

Club career
He made his Russian Football National League debut for FC SKA Rostov-on-Don on 22 July 2002 in a game against FC Amkar Perm.

External links
 

1981 births
Living people
Russian footballers
FC Lokomotiv Moscow players
FC SKA Rostov-on-Don players
PFC Spartak Nalchik players
FC Akhmat Grozny players
FC Baltika Kaliningrad players
FC Volgar Astrakhan players
Association football midfielders
FC Dynamo Makhachkala players